The year 1888 in architecture involved some significant architectural events and new buildings.

Events
 Roof and dome of Seville Cathedral collapse in an earthquake.
 Friedrich von Schmidt is ennobled.

Buildings and structures

Buildings opened

 January 5 – The Neues deutsches Theater, Prague, designed by Fellner & Helmer with Baron Karl von Hasenauer and Alfons Wertmüller.
 April 11 – The Concertgebouw in Amsterdam, designed by Adolf Leonard van Gendt.
 May – Victoria Terminus station building, designed by Frederick William Stevens for the Great Indian Peninsula Railway, in Bombay's Bori Bunder district (modern-day: Chhatrapati Shivaji Terminus, Mumbai).
 August 12 – Plaza de Toros de El Bibio, Gijón, Asturias, Spain.
 August 17 – Castle of the Three Dragons for 1888 Barcelona Universal Exposition, Spain, designed by Lluís Domènech i Montaner.
 August 18 – Frankfurt (Main) Hauptbahnhof, designed by Hermann Eggert and Johann Wilhelm Schwedler.
 September 20 – Ghazanchetsots Cathedral (Armenian Apostolic Church), designed by Simon Ter-Hakobian(ts).
 October 2 – Annunciation Cathedral, Kharkiv, Ukraine, designed by Mikhail Lovtsov.
 October 4 – Princes Bridge, Melbourne, Australia, designed by John Harry Grainger.
 October 14 – Burgtheater, Ringstraße, Vienna, designed by Gottfried Semper and Baron Karl von Hasenauer.
 October 20 – Zappeion, Athens, designed by Theophil Hansen.
 Autumn – Georgia Institute of Technology, Atlanta, Georgia, USA (as the "Georgia School of Technology"), with Tech Tower used for classrooms.

Buildings completed

 St. Anne's Church, Bukit Mertajam, Malaysia.
 Cathedral of Melo, Uruguay.
 Conquest Plantation, Pointe Coupee, Louisiana, USA, built in Victorian style.
 Illinois State Capitol, Springfield, Illinois, USA.
 Ponce de León Hotel, St. Augustine, Florida, USA, designed by John Carrere and Thomas Hastings.
 Texas State Capitol, Austin, Texas, USA, designed by Elijah E. Myers.
 Allegheny County Courthouse, Pittsburgh, Pennsylvania, designed by H.H. Richardson.
 High Royds Hospital (West Riding Pauper Lunatic Asylum) near Leeds, England, designed by J. Vickers Edwards.
 Several buildings for the International Exhibition of Science, Art and Industry held in Glasgow, key architect being James Sellars.
 Elizabeth Plankinton House, Milwaukee, Wisconsin, USA, designed by E. Townsend Mix.
 Casino Notabile, Mdina, Malta, designed by Webster Paulson.

Awards
 RIBA Royal Gold Medal – Theophil Freiherr von Hansen.
 Grand Prix de Rome, architecture: Albert Tournaire.

Births
 January 20 – Léon Azéma, French architect (died 1978)
 February 6 - Romuald Gutt, Polish architect (died 1974)
 March 19 – Piero Portaluppi, Italian architect (died 1967)
 March 19 – Gordon Kaufmann, English-born US architect (died 1949)
 April 30 – Antonio Sant'Elia, Italian Futurist architectural theorist (killed in action 1916)
 June 24 – Gerrit Rietveld, Dutch furniture designer and architect (died 1964)
 August 26 – Gustavo R. Vincenti, Maltese architect and developer (died 1974)
 December 15 – Kaare Klint, Danish architect and furniture designer (died 1954)

Deaths
 January 10 – James Campbell Walker, Scottish architect (born 1821)
 March 16 – Thomas Thomas, Welsh chapel architect and minister (born 1817)
 March 25 – William Eden Nesfield, English domestic revival architect (born 1835)
 August 5 – Edmund Wright, Australian architect, engineer and businessman (born 1824)
 November 25 – Christian Jank, scenic painter and stage designer, commissioned by Ludwig II of Bavaria to create concepts for architectural projects (born 1833)

References

Buildings and structures completed in 1888
Years in architecture
19th-century architecture